Chris Birch is a game designer who has worked primarily on role-playing games.

Career
Chris Birch suggested Cubicle 7's first license, to Starblazer: Science Adventure in Picture (1979-1991), after he discovered in August 2006 that an RPG license for the series was available. Birch knew Angus Abranson slightly through a board game design that had been discussed some years previous and so approached Abranson about the opportunity, and Abranson recruited Birch to write Starblazer Adventures, his first game design. Birch and friend Stuart Newman decided not to create their own game system for the game, so instead opted to using an existing one, Fate. Sarah Newton and Birch designed Legends of Anglerre (2010), an RPG based on fantasy stories from Starblazer.

References

Living people
Role-playing game designers
Year of birth missing (living people)